The 2010 Clemson Tigers football team represented Clemson University in the 2010 NCAA Division I FBS football season. The Tigers were led by head coach Dabo Swinney in his second full year and third year overall after taking over the job midway through the 2008 season. They played their home games at Memorial Stadium and were members of the Atlantic Coast Conference in the Atlantic Division. They finished the season 6–7, 4–4 in ACC play and were invited to the Meineke Car Care Bowl where they were defeated by South Florida, 31–26. As of 2021, this is the only losing season for the Tigers under coach Dabo Swinney's tenure.

Before the season

Departures
Jamie Cumbie (DT, RS Junior) – Dismissed for violation of team rules (assault charges)
J.K. Jay (OL, Freshman) – Back injuries; will remain at Clemson as a student coach
Willy Korn (QB, RS Sophomore) – Graduated; transferred to Marshall University then to North Greenville University
Billy Napier (Offensive Coordinator) – Fired on January 2, 2011
Andre Powell (Running Backs/Special Teams Coach) – Fired on January 2, 2011

Recruiting class

Schedule

Draft picks
The Tigers had 6 players drafted in the 2011 NFL Draft

References

Clemson
Clemson Tigers football seasons
Clemson Tigers football